The 1969–70 Ohio State Buckeyes men's basketball team represented Ohio State University during the 1969–70 season. Led by 12th-year head coach Fred Taylor, the Buckeyes finished 15–9 (8–6 Big Ten).

Roster

Schedule/results

|-
!colspan=9 style=| Regular Season
|-

References

Ohio State Buckeyes men's basketball seasons
Ohio State